Koblar is a surname. Notable people with this surname include:

 Andreja Koblar (born 1971), former Slovenian biathlete
 France Koblar (1889–1975), Slovenian literary historian, editor and translator
 Jernej Koblar (born 1971), former Slovenian alpine skier
 Luka Koblar  (born 1999), Slovenian footballer